The following is a list of actors who have played Inspector Lestrade in various media.

Radio and audio dramas

Stage plays

Television and DTV films

Television series

Theatrical films

Video games

Inspector Lestrade is played by unknown actors in multiple video games including the Sherlock Holmes: Consulting Detective series (1991–1993), The Case of the Serrated Scalpel (1994), The Case of the Rose Tattoo (1996), Sherlock Holmes: The Case of the Silver Earring (2004), Sherlock Holmes Versus Arsène Lupin (2007), and The Testament of Sherlock Holmes (2012).

See also
List of actors who have played Sherlock Holmes
List of actors who have played Dr. Watson
List of actors who have played Mycroft Holmes
List of actors who have played Mrs. Hudson
List of actors who have played Professor Moriarty

References 

Actors who have played Inspector Lestrade
Lestrade